Åke Svenson (born 29 March 1953) is a Swedish Olympic middle-distance runner. He represented his country in the men's 1500 meters at the 1976 Summer Olympics. His time was a 3:44.42 in the first heat. He also competed in the men's 800 metres, posting a 1:48.86 in the heats.

References

1953 births
Living people
Swedish male middle-distance runners
Olympic athletes of Sweden
Athletes (track and field) at the 1976 Summer Olympics
Sportspeople from Uppsala